Heartful Café is a 2021 Philippine television drama romantic comedy series broadcast by GMA Network. Directed by Mark Sicat dela Cruz, it stars Julie Anne San Jose and David Licauco, it premiered on April 26, 2021 on the network's Telebabad line up replacing I Can See You. The series concluded on June 18, 2021 with a total of 40 episodes.

The series is streaming online on YouTube.

Cast and characters

Lead cast
 Julie Anne San Jose as Heart Fulgencio
 David Licauco as Ace Nobleza

Supporting cast
 Edgar Allan Guzman as Uno Ynares
 Zonia Mejia as Soledad "Sol" Fulgencio
 Jamir Zabarte as Salvador "Buddy" Portales
 Ayra Mariano as Marcelina "Mars" Sawingsawing
 Victor Anastacio as Roco
 Angel Guardian as Charity

Guest cast
 Shyr Valdez as Chona
 Ina Feleo as Zowie
 Kate Valdez as Diana
 Migo Adecer as Max / Charles
 DJ Durano as Jeremiah
 Barbie Forteza as Cors
 Jak Roberto as Jasper
 Richard Reynoso as Raffy
 Rosemarie Sarita as Belen
 Nicole Chan as Virgo
 Klea Pineda as Ivy
 Jeric Gonzales as Warren
 Gold Aceron as Garci
 Nikki Co as Sebastian / Seb
 Candy Pangilinan as Andi
 Camille Prats as Bettina

Production
Principal photography commenced in April 2021.

Ratings
According to AGB Nielsen Philippines' Nationwide Urban Television Audience Measurement People in television homes, the pilot episode of Heartful Café earned a 14.1% rating.

References

External links
 
 

2021 Philippine television series debuts
2021 Philippine television series endings
Filipino-language television shows
GMA Network drama series
Television series set in restaurants
Television shows set in the Philippines
Philippine romantic comedy television series